The 2019 American Athletic Conference football season is the 28th NCAA Division I FBS Football season of the American Athletic Conference (The American). The season is the seventh since the former Big East Conference dissolved and became the American Athletic Conference and the sixth season of the College Football Playoff in place. The American is considered a member of the Group of Five (G5) together with Conference USA (C–USA), the Mid-American Conference (MAC), the Mountain West Conference and the Sun Belt Conference. The entire schedule was released on February 7, 2019.

Previous season
After winning their first twelve games of the season, UCF extended their school record winning streak to 25 consecutive games, dating back to the start of the 2017 season. The Knights also secured their second consecutive undefeated regular season and American Athletic Conference title by defeating Memphis in the 2018 AAC Championship game, a rematch of the 2017 game.

Seven teams participated in bowl games during the 2018 season; the league went 2–5.

Tulane defeated Louisiana 41–24 in the 2018 Cure Bowl. USF lost to Marshall, 38–20, in the Gasparilla Bowl. Memphis lost to Wake Forest 38–35 in the 2018 Birmingham Bowl. Houston lost to Army 70–14 in the Armed Forces Bowl. In this game, Army tied records for the largest victory margin and most points scored in an FBS bowl game. Temple lost to Duke 56–27 in the Independence Bowl. Cincinnati defeated Virginia Tech 35–31 in the Military Bowl.

In the New Year's Six Game, No. 8 UCF lost to No. 11 LSU 40–32 in the Fiesta Bowl.

Preseason

Impending departure of UConn
The most significant development in the conference during the 2019 preseason was the announcement that UConn would leave The American after the 2019–20 school year to join several of its former conference rivals in the current non-football iteration of the Big East Conference. The move was first reported on June 21, 2019, by a Boston-area sports news website and quickly picked up by national media outlets. On June 27, the Big East and UConn jointly confirmed the Huskies' impending conference move, but that announcement did not specify a date. The Huskies' Big East entrance date was confirmed for July 1, 2020 after UConn and The American reached a buyout agreement. At the time this agreement was announced, UConn also announced that its football team would become an FBS independent once it joined the Big East.

Recruiting classes

American Athletic Conference Media Days
The American Athletic Conference conducted its 2019 American Athletic Conference media day on July 17 in Newport, Rhode Island.

Preseason Media Poll
The preseason Poll was released at the 2019 American Media Day on July 16, 2019.

American Champion Voting
UCF (12)
Cincinnati (8)
Memphis (6)
Houston (4)

Head coaches

Coaching changes
On November 29, 2018, East Carolina fired head coach Scottie Montgomery. On December 3, 2018, ECU hired James Madison head coach Mike Houston as their new head coach.

On December 7, 2018, Geoff Collins left Temple to become head coach at Georgia Tech. On December 13, 2018, The Owls initially named Miami defensive coordinator Manny Diaz as the new head coach. However, on December 30, 2018, Diaz left to return to Miami as head coach after Mark Richt's retirement. On January 10, 2019 Temple announced Rod Carey as head coach.

On December 30, 2018 Major Applewhite was fired after a blowout loss in the 2018 Armed Forces Bowl. Houston replaced Applewhite by hiring Dana Holgorsen from West Virginia.

Coaches
Note: All stats current through the completion of the 2019 season

Source:

Rankings

Schedule

Regular season
The regular season began on August 29, 2019, and will end on December 14. As a result of the calendar, all teams except Navy will have two bye weeks.

Week 1

Week 2

 

Week 3

Week 4

 
 

Week 5

 

Week 6

 
 

 *Note: The UConn/USF Kickoff was moved to noon as a safety precaution after receiving guidance from the Connecticut Department of Public Health regarding the mosquito-borne eastern equine encephalitis virus.Week 7

Week 8

Week 9

 

Week 10

Week 11

 

Week 12

Week 13

 
 

Week 14

 

 

Week 15 (American Athletic Conference Championship)

Week 16

Source:

Post Season
Bowl games

Rankings are from AP Poll.  All times Eastern.

Selection of teams
Bowl eligible: Cincinnati, Memphis, Navy, SMU, Temple, Tulane, UCF,
Bowl-ineligible: Houston, East Carolina, South Florida, Tulsa, UConn

The American vs other conferences
The American vs Power 5 matchups
This is a list of games The American has scheduled versus power conference teams (ACC, Big 10, Big 12, Pac-12, Notre Dame and SEC). Although the NCAA does not consider BYU a "Power Five" school, the ACC considers games against BYU as satisfying its "Power Five" scheduling requirement. Though the American does not consider BYU a power 5 team they consider them an equally strength opponent. All rankings are from the current AP Poll at the time of the game.

The American vs Group of Five matchups
The following games include The American teams competing against teams from the C-USA, MAC, Mountain West or Sun Belt.

The American vs FBS independents matchups
The following games include The American teams competing against FBS independents other than Notre Dame, which is universally considered a Power Five program, or BYU, which some but not all Power Five leagues consider to be a Power Five opponent for non-conference scheduling purposes. Of the remaining four independents, two are on American member schedules—Army and UMass.

The American vs FCS matchups

Records against other conferences

Regular Season

Post Season

Awards and honors

Player of the week honors

American Athletic Individual Awards
The following individuals received postseason honors as voted by the American Athletic Conference football coaches at the end of the season

All-conference teams*Denotes Unanimous SelectionAll Conference Honorable Mentions:
UCF: Otis Anderson Jr. (RB),  Nevelle Clarke (CB), Tre Nixon (WR),  Kenny Turnier (DL)
Cincinnati: Sam Crosa (K), Ja'Von Hicks (S)
ECU: CJ Johnson (WR), D'Ante Smith (OT)  
Memphis: T.J. Carter (CB), Joseph Dorceus (DL), O'Bryan Goodson (DL), Austin Hall  (LB), Dylan Parham (OG) 
Navy: Billy Honaker (OT), Jacob Springer (LB)  
South Florida: Mitchell Wilcox (TE)
Tulane: Corey Dublin (OG), BoPete Keyes (CB), P.J. Hall (S)

All-Americans

The 2019 College Football All-America Teams are composed of the following College Football All-American first teams chosen by the following selector organizations: Associated Press (AP), Football Writers Association of America (FWAA), American Football Coaches Association (AFCA), Walter Camp Foundation (WCFF), The Sporting News (TSN), Sports Illustrated (SI), USA Today (USAT) ESPN, CBS Sports (CBS), FOX Sports (FOX) College Football News (CFN), Bleacher Report (BR), Scout.com, Phil Steele (PS), SB Nation (SB), Athlon Sports, Pro Football Focus (PFF) and Yahoo! Sports (Yahoo!).

Currently, the NCAA compiles consensus all-America teams in the sports of Division I-FBS football and Division I men's basketball using a point system computed from All-America teams named by coaches associations or media sources.  The system consists of three points for a first-team honor, two points for second-team honor, and one point for third-team honor.  Honorable mention and fourth team or lower recognitions are not accorded any points.  Football consensus teams are compiled by position and the player accumulating the most points at each position is named first team consensus all-American.  Currently, the NCAA recognizes All-Americans selected by the AP, AFCA, FWAA, TSN, and the WCFF to determine Consensus and Unanimous All-Americans. Any player named to the First Team by all five of the NCAA-recognized selectors is deemed a Unanimous All-American.2018 Consensus All-America Team

*AFCA All-America Team (AFCA)
*Walter Camp Football Foundation All-America Team (WCFF)
*Associated Press All-America Team (AP)
*The Sporting News All-America Team (TSN)
*Football Writers Association of America All-America Team (FWAA)
*Sports Illustrated All-America Team (SI)
*Bleacher Report All-America Team (BR)
*College Football News All-America Team (CFN)
*ESPN All-America Team (ESPN)
*CBS Sports All-America Team (CBS)
*Athlon Sports All-America Team (Athlon)

National award winners2019 College Football Award Winners''

NFL Draft

The following list includes all AAC players who were drafted in the 2020 NFL draft.

References